Plant Field was the first major athletic venue in Tampa, Florida. It was built in 1899 by Henry B. Plant on the grounds of his Tampa Bay Hotel to host various events and activities for guests, and it consisted of a large field ringed by an oval race track flanked by a large covered grandstand on the western straightaway with portable seating used to accommodate a wide variety of uses. Over the ensuing decades, Plant Field drew Tampa residents and visitors to see horse racing, car racing, baseball games, entertainers, and politicians. The stadium also hosted the first professional football and first spring training games in Tampa and was the long-time home of the Florida State Fair.

Al Lopez Field opened in 1954 and Tampa Stadium opened in 1967, and they became the preferred venues for most of the events that had long been held at Plant Field. The aging facility was acquired by the adjacent University of Tampa (UT) in the late 1960s, and in 1971, the name of the grandstand was changed to Pepin-Rood Stadium in honor of university benefactors. After the Florida State Fair moved to a much larger site east of downtown in 1976, Plant Field fell into disuse.

Beginning in the 1980s, the University of Tampa began gradually converting Plant Field to other uses. The race track was removed, a series of academic buildings and student housing were built on the periphery of the venue's large footprint, and the last remaining section of the old grandstand was torn down in 2002. However, portions of the original playing field have been incorporated into new venues for the university's athletic programs along with student recreation.

History

In 1885, the railroad line of Henry B. Plant reached Tampa, connecting the small town to the nation's railroad system for the first time and helping to stimulate rapid growth and development. Plant's company primarily shipped goods such as cigars and citrus from the area, but to encourage passenger travel, he built several hotels in the greater Tampa Bay area, jump starting the region's tourist industry. The largest of these hotels was the Tampa Bay Hotel, a lavish resort containing over 500 rooms which opened across the Hillsborough River from downtown Tampa in 1892. The resort offered many amenities to visitors, including horse riding facilities on the western side of the resort grounds which included a simple track. These facilities were greatly enlarged and expanded in 1899 and become Plant Field, which was large enough to host a wide variety of sports and other activities.

The Tampa Bay Hotel closed in 1931. The new University of Tampa took over most of the facilities in 1933, though the city of Tampa retained control of Plant Field.

Racing
Henry Plant built a horse track on the grounds east of North Boulevard and south of Cass Street, now the site of the University of Tampa athletic fields. During the 1898-99 tourist season, races were sponsored by the Tampa Agricultural Racing and Fair Association. When automobile races were added to the South Florida Fair in 1921, the horse track was converted into a 1/2 mile dirt oval that operated until 1980. Plant Field was also a venue for dirt-track races sanctioned by the International Motor Contest Association until the mid-1970s

Baseball
Baseball began at Plant Field around 1899 when local teams played at what was then called the Tampa Bay Race Track Diamond. With the lure of travel incentives offered by the city government, it became one of the first facilities used by Major League Baseball for spring training when the Chicago Cubs came to train before the 1913 season. The Cubs conducted spring training in Tampa until 1916.  On March 26, 1914, Plant Field hosted the first major league baseball spring training game in the Tampa Bay area when the Cubs defeated the St. Louis Browns 3–2.

After the Cubs departed, the Boston Red Sox used the facility next. On April 4, 1919. Babe Ruth, playing in what would be his last season with the Red Sox, hit a home run 587 feet against the New York Giants during an exhibition game. A plaque remains to commemorate Ruth's achievement as it was considered the longest home run of Ruth's career and one of the longest in baseball history.

Over the years, Plant Field was the spring home to many major league teams, including the Washington Senators in the 1920s, the Detroit Tigers in the 1930s, and the Cincinnati Reds in the 1940s. The Chicago White Sox were Plant Field's last spring training tenant. They last used the facility in 1954 and moved to newly built Al Lopez Field in West Tampa for 1955.

The facility also hosted many minor league, semi-pro, high school, and other baseball games. In November 1950, the Jackie Robinson All-Stars played a local black semi-professional team, the Tampa Rockets, at Plant Field. Robinson's team included major-leaguers Roy Campanella and Larry Doby as well as several Negro league players. Plant Field was the regular home field of the Tampa Smokers of the Florida State League and the Florida International League until the team disbanded after the 1954 season.

Football
On New Year's Day 1926, the Chicago Bears, led by Red Grange, defeated the Tampa Cardinals, a traveling pick-up team featuring Jim Thorpe, 17–3. This game marked the first professional football game played in Tampa. A number of other exhibition games involving professional and college players were played at Plant Field through the decades.

Due to the small capacity of their first on-campus home of Fleming Field, the Florida Gators football team usually scheduled one or two "home" games per season at Plant Field in the early years of the program, especially when facing top college opponents that drew larger crowds. The construction of Florida Field in 1930 reduced the number of Florida football games in Tampa, though the Gators would occasionally schedule "home" games at Plant Field, Phillips Field, or (much later) Tampa Stadium into the 1980s.

The University of Tampa Spartans played their home football games at Plant Field from 1933 until 1936, when they moved to nearby Phillips Field, which they did not have to share with other tenants. Henry B. Plant High School and Hillsborough High School played their annual rivalry game at Plant Field for decades, usually on Thanksgiving Day. A few other high-interest high school football games were also played at the facility from year to year.

Other activities
For decades, Plant Field was the location of the South Florida Fair, the precursor to the Florida State Fair. The fair was almost always scheduled to coincide with Tampa's annual Gasparilla Pirate Festival, and the Gasparilla Parade ended at the Plant Field grandstands from 1905 until 1976.

In 1912, "Buffalo Bill" Cody performed on the field with hundreds of American Indians who traveled with him as part of his show. When Tampa hosted the national reunion of the United Confederate Veterans in 1927, some of the veterans stayed in quarters under the Plant Field grandstands.

Presidential candidate Henry Wallace spoke at Plant Field in February 1948. Wallace insisted that the audience be integrated. This marked the first political speech in Tampa during which blacks and whites could mix. Paul Robeson sang at another integrated Wallace rally at Plant Field later that October.

During the 1952 Presidential Campaign, Dwight D. Eisenhower appeared at Plant Field.

Name change and demolition
Plant Field slowly became obsolete as more specialized sports facilities were built around Tampa. Nearby Phillips Field hosted University of Tampa and the Cigar Bowl football games beginning in the 1930s, and both Plant and Phillips Fields were made obsolete by the construction of Tampa Stadium in 1967. Brand-new Al Lopez Field became the new home of the minor league Tampa Tarpons when they began play in 1957. And in 1977, the Florida State Fair moved to a more spacious location at the intersection of Interstate 4 and U.S. Highway 301 in unincorporated Hillsborough County, just east of Tampa.

In 1971, the University of Tampa Board of Trustees approved a transaction that granted the university possession of Plant Field, and the grandstand was renamed Pepin-Rood Stadium after university benefactors in 1983.

Since then, the school has built many new facilities on its huge footprint, including a soccer field (Pepin Stadium), softball and baseball fields, dormitories, and other academic and athletic facilities. Though some patches of the original playing surface are still in use as part of newer venues, the last remaining portions of Plant Field's old grandstand were torn down in 2002.

See also
 Sports in the Tampa Bay Area
 Baseball in the Tampa Bay area

References

External links
Tampa's Original Field Of Dreams
Plant Field
Tampa Bay Football History Network
Tampa's Plant Field, April 4, 1919: The spring training home run that changed baseball history...forever!
Aerial of Plant Field with baseball layout
Sanborn map showing portions of Plant Field, 1915

1899 establishments in Florida
2002 disestablishments in Florida
Baseball venues in Florida
Boston Red Sox spring training venues
Chicago Cubs spring training venues
Chicago White Sox spring training venues
Cincinnati Reds spring training venues
Defunct American football venues in the United States
Defunct college football venues
Demolished sports venues in Florida
Detroit Tigers spring training venues
History of Tampa, Florida
Minnesota Twins spring training venues
Motorsport venues in Florida
Spring training ballparks
Sports venues in Tampa, Florida
Tampa Spartans football
1900s in Florida
Sports venues completed in 1899
Sports venues demolished in 2002
University of Tampa
Florida State Fair